Alapur, is a village in Barabanki district in the state of Uttar Pradesh, India. The village is situated 3 km from Barabanki city towards Lucknow on the west bank of Reth river.

History
During archaeological excavation of ancient mound at Alapur black slipped ware and grey ware dating pre Shunga-Kushana to early medieval period were excavated.

Geography

Jind baba ki Mazar is located on National Highway 27. Lucknow-Faizabad road enters Barabanki by crossing the Reth river by a bridge at Alapur

References

Villages in Barabanki district